Sowerby Bridge is a market town and a ward to the southwest of Halifax in the metropolitan borough of Calderdale, West Yorkshire, England.  It contains 67 listed buildings that are recorded in the National Heritage List for England.  Of these, three are at Grade II*, the middle of the three grades, and the others are at Grade II, the lowest grade.  The ward contains the town of Sowerby Bridge, the smaller settlement of Friendly, and the surrounding area.  Industries developed in the area from the later 18th century following the building of the Calder and Hebble Navigation and the Rochdale Canal.  Most of the industrial buildings have gone, but some mills remain that have been converted for other uses and are listed.  In addition to the canals, the River Calder and the River Ryburn run through the area, and the listed buildings associated with these waterways are bridges, locks, warehouses, and other structures.  The other listed buildings include houses and associated structures, road and railway bridges, shops, civic buildings, churches and associated structures, a former Sunday school, farmhouses and farm buildings, a milepost, a milestone, public houses and hotels, and a folly in the form of a tower.


Key

Buildings

References

Citations

Sources

Lists of listed buildings in West Yorkshire
Listed